The eighth series of Acapulco Shore, a Mexican television programme based in Acapulco was confirmed on 19 January 2021. The eighth season began airing on 27 April 2021, as the show returned to the Acapulco area after 2 seasons, the season has been advertised with the subtitle: The family is back in Acapulco (Spanish: La familia de regreso en Acapulco). The season was filmed in Acapulco, in compliance with local CDC Guidelines related to the COVID-19 pandemic. This is the first series that does not include the original cast members Luis Caballero, Luis Méndez, Manelyk González, Tadeo Fernández and Talía Loaiza, as well as Rocío Sánchez and Xavier Ulibarrí. Prior to the series premiere, it was announced that twelve new cast members Aarón “Capitán” Albores, Alba, Zepeda, Beni Falcón, Charlotte Caniggia, Diana Chiquete, Diego Garciasela from El Mundo Real, Eddie Schobert, Fernanda “Fer” Moreno, Isa Castro, Ignacia “Nacha” Michelson, Jacky Ramírez, Jaylin Castellanos, and Matheus Crivella from De Ferias com o Ex had joined the cast.

It is the first season to feature two  LGBT female cast members. Albores was removed by production after showing aggressive behavior and threatening to kill another cast member. Beni Falcón left the series in episode ten. Ignacia Michelson announced her departure from the program to focus on her mental health. Matheus Crivella also did not return to the show after joining Rio Shore.

Cast 

 Aarón "Capitán" Albores (Episodes 1–7)
 Alba Zepeda
 Beni Falcón (Episodes 1–10)
 Charlotte Caniggia (Episodes 11–15)
 Diana Chiquete (Episodes 10–15)
 Diego Garciasela
 Eduardo "Chile" Miranda
 Eduardo "Eddie" Schobert (Episodes 8–15)
 Fernanda "Fer" Moreno
 Ignacia “Nacha” Michelson
 Isabel "Isa" Castro
 Jacky Ramirez
 Jaylin Castellanos
 Jibranne "Jey" Bazán
 Karime Pindter
 Matheus Crivella (Episodes 10–15)
 Ramiro Giménez (Episodes 6–15)

Duration of cast 

 = Cast member is featured in this episode.
 = Cast member arrives in the house.
 = Cast member voluntarily leaves the house.
 = Cast member is removed from the house.
 = Cast member leaves and returns to the house in the same episode.
 = Cast member returns to the house.
 = Cast member leaves the series.
 = Cast member is removed from the series.
 = Cast member returns to the series.
 = Cast member does not feature in this episode.
 = "Cast member" is not a cast member in this episode.

Episodes 
Note: Some episode titles have been adpated to a more understandable English translation

Impact of the COVID-19 pandemic 
Filming for the season was originally set to begin on February 13, 2021, but was not possible due to complications related to the COVID-19 pandemic. It was finally registered in Acapulco de Juárez between February 26 and March 20, 2021 amid the COVID-19 pandemic in Mexico, where precautions were taken to ensure the safety of the cast and production team. Both the cast and crew were screened for COVID-19 after being quarantined for two weeks prior to filming. During filming, the production wore personal protective equipment and stood 2 meters from the crew members. The health situation prevented the recordings from proceeding normally, preventing the cast from heading to locations commonly selected for production. Instead, the public spaces were replaced by a mansion that had a club, a restaurant, and a pier.

References 

Mexican reality television series
2021 Mexican television seasons
Television productions postponed due to the COVID-19 pandemic